This is a list of winners and nominees of the Primetime Emmy Award for Outstanding Short Form Variety Series. The category was initiated in 2016 alongside Outstanding Short Form Comedy or Drama Series and Outstanding Short Form Nonfiction or Reality Series. The awards replaced the now-retired category for Outstanding Short-Format Live-Action Entertainment Program. In 2021, this award was merged with Outstanding Short Form Comedy or Drama Series to form the Primetime Emmy Award for Outstanding Short Form Comedy, Drama or Variety Series. These awards were not presented at the Primetime Emmy Awards show, but at the Creative Arts Emmy Award show.

Winners and nominations

2010s

2020s

Programs with multiple awards
3 awards
 Carpool Karaoke: The Series

Programs with multiple nominations
Totals include nominations for Outstanding Special Class — Short-Format Nonfiction Programs.

4 nominations
 Honest Trailers

3 nominations
 Carpool Karaoke: The Series
 Gay of Thrones

2 nominations
 The Daily Show — Between the Scenes
 Epic Rap Battles of History
 Park Bench with Steve Buscemi
 The Randy Rainbow Show

References

Short Form Variety Series
Awards disestablished in 2020
Awards established in 2016